Elgee  is a surname. Notable people with the surname include:

 Cyril Hammond Elgee (1871–1917), British colonial administrator in Nigeria
 Frank Elgee (1880–1944), British archaeologist, geologist and naturalist
 Jane Wilde (1821–1896), née Elgee, Irish poet and mother of Oscar Wilde

See also
 Algie